Bolívar is a town and municipality in Antioquia Department, Colombia. Part of the subregion of Southwestern Antioquia. It is known as the birthplace of professional international cyclists Carlos Betancur and Julián Arredondo.

References

Municipalities of Antioquia Department